Chad Michael Overhauser (born June 17, 1975) is a former American football offensive lineman. He attended the University of California, Los Angeles, where he was an All-American in 1997.

References

1975 births
Living people
American football offensive tackles
UCLA Bruins football players
Chicago Bears players
Seattle Seahawks players
Houston Texans players
Players of American football from Sacramento, California
All-American college football players